Maradeka, is an emerging pro-democracy Muslim political organization espousing non-violent political action in the Philippines amidst the backdrop of over four decades of armed Muslim insurgency mounted by Moro National Liberation Front (MNLF) and Moro Islamic Liberation Front (MILF) in their Moro Quest for self-rule after people dissenting  Philippine government treatment of Muslim minority as second class citizens and suffering years of social, economic, and political inequities called Mindanao problem

Maradeka is rooted from Malay word merdeka etymologically means freedom or liberation In reinvigorating the spirit and inherent values of freedom from Malay forebears, the word Maradeka was adopted as the name of the umbrella freedom alliance of 72 Bangsamoro civil society and political organizations, groups such as Task Force Mindanao, Alternative Muslim Mindanao Entrepreneurial Dev't, Inc (AMMENDI), Basilan Solidarity, Organization of Maguindanaon and Iranon, Bangsamoro Consultative Assembly, Bangsamoro Supreme Council of Ulama (BSCU), Maradeka Youth, Bangsa Iranun Muslim Advocates for Peace, Inc., Ittihadun As-Shabab Al-Muslimeen, Karitan Foundation Inc., Mindanao Peace Observers, Manila Peace Zone Community Association (MAPZCA), and Mindanao War Victims.

Maradeka, a Philippine civil society network and alliance of Moro organizations, pursues its social and political advocacy and development programs with its partners organizations and institutions. It build its organization's strength in grass-root community and citizens' action  and consensus building through its regional people assemblies (RPA) held in various regions widely in Mindanao and Sulu, and growing in the Central Luzon and Calabarzon area. Maradeka as ideological organization takes its main form of action in articulating voices of marginalized Moro people, democratic dialogues, participatory community consultations (shura), social and political advocacy campaigns, and launches mass actions to demonstrate its protests, appeal, and demands on various legitimate issues to influence policies affecting the Muslim people.

Moro War for Secession from Philippines
The Muslims in the Southern Philippines known as Moro or Bangsamoro claimed to have preceded the Philippine Commonwealth when the United States Government granted in 1935 self-rule due to the demand for independence by Filipino politicians headed by Manuel L. Quezon. The Bangsamoro people have established their independent Sultanates, namely the Sultanate of Sulu, Sultanate of Maguindanao and the Pat A Pangampong of Ranaw (Federal States of Ranaw). These Moro Sultanates mounted a colonial resistance called Spanish–Moro Wars by Dr. Casar Adib Majul in his book History of the Muslims in the Philippines, against the incursion of Spanish Colonial power in 1571 and the annexation of the Mindanao, Sulu, and Palawan islands by the United States of America in the Moro–American War (1899–1913) after the Spanish–American War (1899–1902). The Moros fought against the Japanese invasion in World War II.

The last four decades Philippine–Bangsamoro conflict perhaps the most recent but not the last stage of Moro Wars. The modern Muslim revolt came in with an unorganized uprising in early 1950 with Kamlon revolt and during the later part of 1968 with organized secessionist Mindanao Independence Movement of Udtog Matalam which jolted the Philippine government. After the infamous Jabidah Massacre on March 18, 1968 saw the emergence of the Sabah trained "Black Shirts" who fought the Philippine militias called "Ilaga," they came to be known later as the Moro National Liberation Front seeking to establish what it called the independent Bangsamoro Republik. After the declaration of Pres. Marcos of the Martial Law on September 21, 1972, one month later, the Moro rebels in the historic Marawi revolt stormed Philippine Constabulary camps and government installations in Marawi City and overran the state university calling for Muslim secession and days after like a wild fire the Moro revolution became widespread all over Mindanao. A Philippine Army general, Fortunato Abat, aptly recounted how Philippine nearly lost Mindanao.

The freedom-loving Moro people lived up to its Malay tradition to enjoy the collective life "free" from alien subjugation, control, or dominance. The indigenous human rights to life and self-determination is valiantly defended by the early Moro leaders, chieftains, datus, Sultans, and every Moro freedom fighters in their generations. The American soldiers attested to the ferociousness of the Moro warriors in the battlefield. In continuing the struggle, Maradeka emerged as non-violent political organization as an alternative to armed struggle mounted by the Moro National Liberation Front (MNLF) during their secessionist campaign beginning in 1968 and sustained by its breakaway groups, namely: MNLF Reformist Group led by Kumander Dimas Pundato and Moro Islamic Liberation Front (MNLF) led by late Ustadz Salamat Hashim in war for self-rule in Mindanao, the largest southern islands of the Philippines.

The restlessness in the recurrent Mindanao conflict brought Moro political activists and bonded Islamists and pro-democratic political groups of youth and students, academe, professionals, clerics, workers and employees, businessmen, traders, urban poor, overseas contract workers, and women in the push for broader people participation toward peace and democracy in the Philippines.

Origin of Rising Moro Organization
Convenors of Maradeka evolved from the middle of the 1980s during the height of Muslim student activism in Mindanao as new option for peaceful and democratic people participation against the backdrop of Bangsamoro people armed resistance against the repressive and chauvinistic Philippine  government of strongman Pres. Marcos. Now, Maradeka as it was formally organized during its Convenor' Assembly in University of the Philippines as mass organization in July 2000, stepped up the broadening and heightening of mass struggle in the attainment of its lofty aspiration for freedom, justice, human rights, and the assertion of Bangsamoro people's right to self-determination.

Maradeka had been active in advancing Moro civil and political rights and the advocacy of peace cognizant of the United Nations International covenants on ECOSOC and Civil and Political Rights. The unabated political repression, oppression, and discrimination resulting to serious violations of human rights, civil liberties, and deprivations of economic, cultural and social rights by the government authorities perpetrated against the Muslims in Mindanao,  more popularly known as the Bangsamoro people have caused more public resistance and banded cause-oriented groups to redress collectively these pressing problems confronting them.

Maradeka became active in embarking on direct socio-political action to address the complexities of issues affecting the Muslim communities. The recurrent wars for decades brought thousands in mass poverty and displacement in Mindanao. It believed the war of attrition must come to its end. As Peace Observer, in the peace process between the Government of the Philippines and the Moro Islamic Liberation Front, it sought a "win-win" solution to the Mindanao armed conflict, fought against spoilers of peace and saboteurs and avert impasse of peace talks brokered by Malaysia. If the option for a sub-state formula cannot be met by the Philippine peace panel, the federal option will be viable, or it will seek a "determination vote' to the United Nations as the last option.

Ideology
Maradeka espoused the Islamic Ideology and Islamic democracy. It believed in the core values of freedom and equality as the foundation of human dignity and social justice. Like every Muslim organization, Maradeka asserts in the rhetoric of their leaders of Bangsamoro nationhood and the adherence to the political principles of Islam based on its precepts, namely: Tawhid (Monotheism), Khilafah (Trusteeship), Hakimiyyah (Sovereignty), Risalah (Message), Hukuwat (Brotherhood), and Jihad (Mass Struggle). It looked forward to the resilience of the freedom-loving Bangsamoro people holding to their ancestors tradition that had found strength in the intrinsic value inherent in the social and political life of the Malay people to live free continually resistant  to the influences and dominance of colonial powers- Spanish and American.

Its founders in carrying out its part in the Islamic movement propounded that while the universal Muslim Ummah is in the dire state of Darul Harb and the Muslim world is fragmented into nation-states, viewed the Khilafat, the world Islamic government  as a utopia. Thus, the Muslim organization find their advocacy of temporal socio-political ideology, Islamic democracy as a transition to absolute realization of comprehensive Islamic way of life and egalitarian state of Darul Islam. The adoption of Islamic democracy and the building of Sharia-based Islamic democratic government found the model in the Islamic political construct from Islamic Republics in Pakistan, Malaysia, and Iran. In advancing the Islamic democratic ideology, it found inspiration from many Muslim political thinkers notably the political works and treatises of Syed Abu Ala Maududi of Jamaat-e-Islami in Pakistan, Abhoud Syed Lingga of Institute of Bangsamoro Studies in the Philippines. It seeks to build a Sharia-based Muslim government and state in Mindanao and Philippines.

The fast Islamic resurgence sweeping the entire Muslim world gradually evolved Maradeka to become another brand of political Islam in the Philippines as it adhered to the Islamic fundamentalist creed of Tauhid: Laa ilaha illaallah, Muhammad Ar-Rasulullah (There is no god but Allah, and Muhammad is the Final Prophet) whereby in the mainstream of the universal Islamic movement its mode of political action embarks on the Islamic democratic struggle to attain its goals. Though the Muslims in the Philippines appeared to be in the minority with Muslim population consisting of about 14 million, it found fraternal relations with the Muslim world, a total population of 1.4 billion. Maradeka joins the Muslim world and the Pan-Islamic movement and toward realization of the Darul Salam, it envisioned the reconstruction of the universal Muslim Ummah.

Organization and Operation
Maradeka is a uniquely reclusive ideological organization operating as Islamic movement but distinctly separate and as it claimed as antithetical to and from wide range political spectrum and groupings in the Philippine political setting. Its ideological doctrine do not permit alliances with secular political parties and any of the factions of Philippine's communist groups or its front organization, be it in the re-affirmist or the rejectionist faction. Maradeka is a cause-oriented mass-based organization with 68 hardline member affiliates from various Moro sectors, regional groups, clerics (ulama), people organizations, civil society, urban community associations, developmental non-government organizations. The Majlis is the Highest Governing Council and The Permanent Secretariat led by the Secretary-General ran the operations of the organization's organs and major action programmes.

Maradeka was seen as street parliamentarians in an open mass movement in the Philippine political scene. As ideological organization, Maradeka put on its main form of action through democratic dialogues, community consultations (shura), and staged mass actions into the street to demonstrate its protests, public appeals, and demands on various legitimate issues detrimental to the Muslim people. Due to the adverse political environment in the Philippines, Maradeka in support of the MNLF and MILF legitimate struggle has operated vigilantly a non-violent political action albeit cautiously along the steep campaign of the Philippine government against extremism and terrorism.

Current works, programs and Islamic activities

Following activities of Maradeka, it endeavored to stand as voice in the defense of the Muslim civil liberties and the human rights protection and the bearer of the people cause for peace, freedom and in advancing non-violent political action as it actively works for the peaceable resolution of the Mindanao problem and empowering people into direct people participation in the building of genuine self-rule in Mindanao and Philippines. It also works in providing and assisting communities in alleviating mass poverty through grass-root education, community development, capability building, and relief operations and contributes significantly in the mutual understanding and co-existence of inter-faith groups and communities toward a harmonious multi-cultural society and send the message of Islam in wisdom, virtues, and good deeds across the Philippine and South East Asia.

In the Maradeka In Action Primer, it has its Programmatic Actions and among its thrust and programs are: Protection of the civil liberties and fundamental human rights of the Muslim communities in cooperation with various human rights groups. It provides necessary professional works in advocacy, documentation, paralegal trainings, education, networking, and humanitarian assistance to  victims of human rights abuses and their families through legal and medical services; Empowerment of Muslim Communities. It operationalizes practice of Islam as a comprehensive system and ideology in all facets of life in the Muslim communities and enjoins peaceful, open, and liberation mass struggle (jihadun jamian) in attaining its goals and ideals toward prosperity (aflaha). Da'wah and Tazkiah works is principally adopted as an organizing strategy in building strong Muslim Ummah; People Initiative for Democratic Rights with peaceful campaign in the resolution of  Mindanao Problem through active promotion of non-violence and Culture of Peace. It asserts the primacy of recognizing the democratic rights of main stakeholders-the Bangsamoro People as the sole determinant of their political status.

Through its member affiliates it pursues development programs such as a welfare-oriented civic assistance which is primarily responsible in helping alleviate mass poverty, dislocation, lack of medical and health services, and victims of calamities and armed conflict in Mindanao. It institutes cooperative development mechanism to provide self-help and self-reliant assistance to the needy and poor, and displaced families in the urban areas and it established solidarity works with people organizations in the Asia-Pacific and the Middle East who share similar common aspiration and ideals. It also build tactical alliance and coalition with Moro political groups and create domestic and global networks with agencies, foreign democratic institutions, or peoples in the advancement of its goals.

Bangsamoro Democratic Struggle
Asserting the Democratic rights as a people. Sources from Philippine media indicated Maradeka stepped forward as voice of civil liberty expression in various Muslim concerns and issues such human rights violations committed against innocent civilians, graft and corruption and electoral frauds in the Philippine political system, and the right to self-determination of the Bangsamoro people. Maradeka subscribed to the assertion by prominent Moro leader Abhoud Syed Lingga of Moro people right or any peoples everywhere in the world to freely determine their political status. The Moro people as distinct people deserved to attain self-determination and for this right to be fully effective, the realization of the political, economic, social and cultural sovereignty of this indigenous people in Mindanao ought to be recognized and respected by the international community and Philippines.

Push for Mindanao Peace process. Maradeka push for resumption of peace negotiations between Philippines and Moro Islamic Liberation Front (MILF) which was impeded caused by the diplomatic impasse over the disagreement on the choice of third country facilitator and the facilitation process. See the article: Muslims want government to break impasse. In another tussles in Mindanao peace process, Mindanao peace advocates, on the other hand, had decried the public quibbling over the proposed Bangsamoro substate as counter-productive at this crucial stage of the peace negotiations. Maradeka secretary general Nash Pangadapun also cautioned the public against such premature comments pending the government's submission of its counter-proposal, and called for sobriety. In a very recent development, Maradeka lauded the pronouncement of Secretary Teresita Quintos Deles for the formal signing of peace pact by the Philippine government with the largest Moro rebel front, Moro Islamic Liberation Front (MILF) on March 27, 2014 adding, “After 17 long years of arduous negotiations, we are finally arriving at a political settlement that will seal enduring peace and progress in Mindanao,” Presidential Adviser on the Peace Process Teresita Quintos Deles said Friday. “The signing of the CAB is expected to benefit not only the Bangsamoro but the entire country, and will radiate beyond our borders to the regional community, and perhaps the whole world.” In a step up for massive information drive thru government controlled Television Network, Maradeka Secretary General Nash Pangadapun urged the spoilers who are out to obstruct the peace deal from coming to fruition to back off and called on the enemies of peace to have "change of heart" as this historic signing to be attended by mediating countries and international communities hoped to end violence against women and children.

Advocating Human Rights, Civil Liberties and Anti Discrimination. During International Human Rights Day celebration on Dec. 10, 2010 marked the 62nd anniversary of Universal Declaration of Human Rights. Maradeka and the Mindanao Peace Observers launched the March for Peace and Human Rights with the demand of the Mindanao civil society groups for fighting cultural minority rights, Mindanao peace and the release of one senior MILF official Edward Mohandis Guerra and 25 more Moro political detainees arrested by Philippine intelligence operatives. Guerra a Moro leader was arrested on September 22, 2010 in Davao City in time for his departure in a local airport for his attendance to the Geneva's United Nations' Human Rights Council Meeting. In continuing its human rights advocacy, it denounced the attack in North Cotabato and accused the military of perpetrating the bombing and then pinning the blame on the MILF. Maradeka fought against extrajudicial killings, raised voice condemning the attack of Muslim mosque killing four (4) faithfuls because it was timed with the congregational prayer time of Muslims in the local mosque, local terrorism sponsored by political clan and perpetrated by combined politicos and Philippine military.

Promoting Inter-faith Dialogue and Rejecting Extremism. In the aftermath of 9/11, Maradeka saw the widespread discrimination against Muslims and Islam. Extremists and terrorists became synonymous with Islam and any bearded men or people wearing turbans, hijabs or white skullcaps were subject to insults and attacks. Abu Sayyaf Group in the Philippines came to hijack Islam and the future of Muslims. Maradeka led Moro groups in protesting these discriminatory acts including underhanded treatment of Muslims, human rights abuse, Philippine Anti-terrorism law targeted only Muslims and push for National ID system indiscriminately wanted implementation only on Muslims. However, it discourages adverse reactions of Muslims against other religions and enjoined moderation, mutual understanding and respect.

Advance Democratic and Political Reforms. Maradeka described Philippines as a fragile "democratic" state. It had entirely copied the United States of America political system since 1935 Philippine Constitution but it is a failing state because genuine democracy do not exist to run the course of Philippine government but only catered to Hispanic Filipino elites and oligarchy. Muslims continue to protest the annexation of Mindanao, democratic Muslim representation; Moro revolutionary leaders lodge its complain over derogation of the 1996 Jakarta Final Peace Accord and the over 10 years of Philippine gov't and MILF peace negotiations; Muslim civil society groups slammed Philippine court for preventing reforms in the Autonomous Region in Muslim Mindanao (ARMM); Now, Muslim leaders seek Constitutional Reforms to pave  the way for "win win" formula to resolve Mindanao problem through a shift to federal form of government in Philippines.

Supports Freedom and Democracy Movements
Maradeka lend support to the causes for national liberation movements throughout the world recognizing peoples' their right to self-determination. It is asserting indigenous peoples their full freedom as a birthright and redemption of their national identity and human dignity. Maradeka launched in 2001 the Philippine Committee for Solidarity to Palestine (PHISOP) and take the lead role in Philippine protests against Israel atrocities and illegal annexation of Palestinian homeland. Maradeka expressed support also for the Khasmiris in the Indian-Pakistan dispute, protested the Pres. George Bush and US government for its baseless accusation of Iraq's Weapons of Mass Destruction (WMD)and war of aggression against the Iraqi people, and supported the Kurdis people restless liberation struggle from Turkey and Iraq.

Maradeka established links with Muslim democratic agencies and Islamic activists, namely the Center for Islam and Democracy and the Jamaat e Islami in furtherance of its International solidarity action for peace and Islamic democracy.

Support Peace in Mindanao
Maradeka supports peace gabs with Moro leaders and Philippine Pres. Aquino III out of the box solution of Mindanao conflict  and conclusion of peace between Moro Islamic Liberation Front and Philippine government with the forging of Framework Agreement on the Bangsamoro on October 15, 2012 as a breakthrough in providing roadmap to finally decades of armed hostilities in Mindanao. Though, Maradeka is not completely giving up on the liberation struggle but it sees the opportunities of giving peace the chance and consolidating people under a Bangsamoro government. It called all Moro factions particularly MNLF's leader Nur Misuari to cooperate and heed the call of the Moro youth and work out a political mechanism to end factionalism through the political system offered under the Bangsamoro democratic government.

As the Philippine government and Moro Islamic Liberation Front gone through their peace panels hurdling the four (4) annexes to complete the Framework Agreement on the Bangsamoro (FAB) and draft the Compreehensive Agreement of the Bangsamoro (CAB), the installation of the Bangsamoro Transition Commission (BTC) was shaping up the Bangsamoro Basic Law which will govern the self-governing entity called Bangsamoro Ministerial Government through sessions with experts with the aid of United Nations and World Bank(Fastrac) and broad public consultations in all areas covered under the agreed upon Bangsamoro territories. In this light, Maradeka re-echoed the call of the traditional political leaders not to abandon traditional political system of Mindanao but the inclusion of the homegrown Sultanates of four known territorial Sultanates, such as the Sultanates of Maguindanao, Sulu, Buayan, and Pangampong (Federated) of Ranaw. into the political structure to be created for the new Bangsamoro political entity, whose Basic Law is set to be tackled soon by Philippine government and Moro Islamic Liberation Front (MILF) representatives and passed on for legislation at the Philippine Congress by the end of 2014.

References

External links
 Mindanao Peace Observers Blog, Peace Advocates Hopeful about Aquino Counter-proposal to MILF Sub-state
 Luwaran, MILF Central Committee on Information Official Website
 Moro National Liberation Front (MNLF) Official Website

Islamic organizations based in the Philippines
Islam in the Philippines
Moro people
Political movements in the Philippines
History of Bangsamoro
Muslim Brotherhood
Organizations established in 2000